Susanne Erichsen (born Susanne Firle; 30 December 1925, in Berlin-Steglitz – 13 January 2002, in Berlin) was a German beauty queen, model and entrepreneur.

Labor camp
On 15 June 1945 she married the Norwegian Sven Erichsen. Nineteen at the time, she and her new husband were deported, separated, and sent to Soviet forced labor camps. After five months, her husband was returned to Norway, and she never saw him again. Conscripted to rebuild Stalinogorsk, she did two years of hard labor, including slave labour in a coal mine in Siberia. She was not sent home to Berlin until 1947, when, due to starvation and abuse, she was too sick to be of further use.

Fashion and modelling career
Back in Germany, she was discovered by a female fashion journalist and worked in the following years as a model and photo model. While vacationing on the island of Sylt in the early summer of 1950 she took part in Miss Schleswig-Holstein beauty contest, and won.

On 2 September 1950 she was crowned Miss Germany at the Kurhaus of Baden-Baden. Berlin fashion designers such as Heinz Oestergard and Gehringer & GLUPP participated. The award ceremony was almost a scandal; five of the seven judges protested because the fact Erichsen had been married once before violated the rules. However, because Erichsen's marriage had been officially annulled after a few months, she went on to win. Five days later, on September 9, she participated in the Miss Europe pageant at Rimini.

In 1952, she traveled as an "Ambassador of German Fashion" in the United States. Life magazine devoted a three-page article to Erichsen. At the New York agency Frances Gill models of her caliber received nearly 100 dollars an hour (then 420 dollars), more than half as much as German industrial workers in a month.

After her stay in the USA, Erichsen started to design her own fashions. She founded the Susanne Erichsen GmbH teen models, with a retail space on the Kurfürstendamm and production facilities in Berlin-Tempelhof. She is credited with having introduced the concept of the 'teenager' into the German vernacular.

In 1967, she founded in Berlin a mannequin and model school, which she headed for many years.

Death
In early 2002 Erichsen died of the effects of a stroke. Her autobiography was completed by a co-author and editor, Dorothée Hansen.

References

German female models
1925 births
2002 deaths
German fashion designers
German beauty pageant winners
Models from Berlin
People from Steglitz-Zehlendorf
German women fashion designers